The Holdrege White Sox were a minor league baseball team based in Holdrege, Nebraska. The White Sox played as members of the short–season Class D level Nebraska State League from 1956 to 1959 as an affiliate of the Chicago White Sox. Holdrege first fielded a team in the 1903 Central Nebraska League, winning the league title. The White Sox hosted home minor league games at Holdrege Fairgrounds Park.

History
Holdrege first fielded a minor league team in 1903. The Holdrege team became members of the 1903 Central Nebraska League, an Independent level five–team league that folded after one season. The last known standings were published on July 24, 1903, shortly before the Minden and Giltner teams disbanded. The Red Cloud Indians and McCook would disband shortly thereafter, leaving only Holdrege remaining. Holdrege then played the remainder of the 1903 season as a traveling team. The last known standings had the Holdrege Silver Aces in first place with a 19–7 record, tied with McCook, who had an identical record.

Decades later, the Holdrege White Sox resumed minor league play in Holdrege. The White Sox played four seasons as members of the Class D level Nebraska State League, from 1956 to 1959, as an affiliate of the Chicago White Sox. Holdrege finished the 1956 season with a 33–30 record to finish 6th and last in the Nebraska State League standings. The White Sox finished in third place in 1957 with a record of 33–23. In 1958, Holdrege finished in last place with a record of 29–34 to place 6th. In their final season of play, Holdrege placed second with a 39–23 record. There were no Nebraska State League playoffs in the seasons that Holdrege played.

On opening day in 1956, fans came to the Hotel Dale in Holdrege to see Carl Hubbell, who was a participant in opening day festivities at Fairgrounds Park.

Holdrege had a tradition of Saturday night being "shopping night" in the business district. As a result, Holdrege played Saturday games during the afternoon, as the city's electrical system could not support lights in both the business district and the ballpark being on at the same time.

The Nebraska State League permanently folded after the 1959 season. Holdrege, along with the 1959 league members Hastings Giants, Grand Island Athletics, Kearney Yankees, McCook Braves and North Platte Indians also permanently folded their franchises.

The ballpark
The Holdrege White Sox played were noted to have played minor league home games at Holdrege Fairgrounds Park. The ballpark was also known as "White Sox Park" during minor league play there. On July 24, 1956, the wooden grandstands burned down. The bleachers were quickly rebuilt, and some damaged light poles were also replaced at the ballpark. The park was a favorite of hitters, averaging about three home runs per game. The field is still in use today at the Phelps County Fairgrounds.

Timeline

Year-by-year records

Notable alumni

Alan Brice (1956)
Cam Carreon (1956)
Jim Hicks (1959)
Jerry McNertney (1958)
JC Martin (1956)
George Noga (1958, MGR)
Gary Peters (1956) 2 x MLB All-Star; 1963 AL Rookie of the Year
Skeeter Scalzi (1956, MGR)
Fred Talbot (1959)
Al Weis (1959)

See also
Holdrege White Sox players

References

External links
Holdrege - Baseball Reference
Holdrege - Baseball Reference II

Phelps County, Nebraska
Baseball teams established in 1956
Defunct minor league baseball teams
1956 establishments in Nebraska
1959 disestablishments in Nebraska
Defunct baseball teams in Nebraska
Professional baseball teams in Nebraska
Chicago White Sox minor league affiliates
Baseball teams disestablished in 1959
Nebraska State League teams